R Leporis  (R Lep), sometimes called Hind's Crimson Star, is a well-known variable star in the constellation Lepus, near its border with Eridanus.   It is designated "R" in the chart to the right.

It is a carbon star which appears distinctly red. It is named after famous British astronomer J. R. Hind, who observed it in 1845.  Its apparent magnitude varies from +5.5 to +11.7 with a period of 418–441 days; recent measurements give a period of 427.07 days.  There may be a secondary period of 40 years. R Leporis is too far from earth for its parallax to be measured effectively; Guandalini and Cristallo calculated the luminosity of Mira variables based on their periods. Using a period of 427.07 days, they calculated the bolometric luminosity to be . It was estimated to around 1,350 light-years distant in a 2012 paper, shining with a luminosity approximately 6,689 times that of the Sun and has a surface temperature of 2,980 K.

R Leporis has often been reported as an intense smoky red color, although this is not pronounced when the star is near its maximum brightness. It is reddest when it is dimmest, which occurs every 14.5 months. During these periods it is a candidate for the most-visible reddest star, but this claim is questionable. The red coloration may be caused by carbon in the star's outer atmosphere filtering out the blue part of its visible light spectrum.  The star's discoverer, Hind, reported that it appeared "like a drop of blood on a black field."

References

External links 
 Best of the Advanced Observation Program: R Leporis 
 USA Today.com - NightSky: The Hare and the Dove
 Smoky Mountain Astronomical Society - Hind's Crimson Star: R Leporis 
 Geody Hinds Crimson Star
 Observations of R LEP from AAVSO
 Astronomy picture of the day

Carbon stars
Mira variables
Lepus (constellation)
031996
023203
Leporis, R
1607
Emission-line stars
Durchmusterung objects
TIC objects